The six string quartets, K. 168–173, were composed by Wolfgang Amadeus Mozart in late 1773 in Vienna.  These are popularly known as the Viennese Quartets. Mozart may have hoped to have them published at the time, but they were published only posthumously by Johann André in 1801 as Mozart's Op. 94.

These quartets represent a considerable advance on the Milanese Quartets from less than a year before. Each contains four movements, including minuets and trios. Mozart had been exposed to recently published quartets by Joseph Haydn (Opp. 9 and 17) and was incorporating many of their elements.

The Six Viennese Quartets

Quartet No. 8 in F major, K. 168

Allegro
Andante
Menuetto
Allegro

The slow movement in F minor is a triple-meter canon on the familiar theme also used in the finale of Haydn's Op. 20 No. 5 quartet in the same key, and that Mozart would much later use in the Kyrie from his Requiem.  The finale is a fugue which is also similar to one of the finales of Op. 20, this time the A major quartet (No. 6).

Quartet No. 9 in A major, K. 169

Molto allegro
Andante
Menuetto
Rondeau (allegro)

Quartet No. 10 in C major, K. 170
  
Andante
Menuetto
Un poco adagio
Rondo – Allegro

The opening movement is a theme and variations with a theme that resembles the variation theme used in Haydn's Quartet Op. 9, No. 5 in B flat.  The second phrase of the slow movement contains the opening theme of Haydn's Op. 9 No. 4 in D minor.

Quartet No. 11 in E flat major, K. 171
 
Adagio – Allegro – Adagio
Menuetto
Andante
Allegro assai

Quartet No. 12 in B flat major, K. 172
   
Allegro spiritoso
Adagio
Menuetto
Allegro assai

Quartet No. 13 in D minor, K. 173

Allegro moderato
Andante Grazioso
Menuetto
Allegro moderato

The beginning of the minuet is similar to, and based on, the minuet from Haydn's Op. 9 No. 4 in D minor. The finale is a fugue whose subject begins with a descending chromatic fourth.

Notes

External links

String quartets by Wolfgang Amadeus Mozart
1773 compositions